Frank Lane (1896–1981) was an American baseball executive.

Frank Lane may also refer to:
Frank Lane (trade unionist), British trade unionist
Frank Lane (American football) on List of Stephen F. Austin Lumberjacks in the NFL Draft
Frankie Lane (1948–2011), footballer

See also
Francis Lane, athlete
Frankie Laine (1913–2007), singer
Frank Lane Wolford (1817–1895), U.S. Representative from Kentucky